Liberty Township is a township in Hamilton County, Kansas, USA.  As of the 2000 census, its population was 38.

Geography

Transportation
Liberty Township contains one airport or landing strip, Dikeman Airport.

References
 USGS Geographic Names Information System (GNIS)

External links
 US-Counties.com
 City-Data.com

Townships in Hamilton County, Kansas
Townships in Kansas